The men's 4×100 metre medley relay event at the 1992 Summer Olympics took place on 31 July at the Piscines Bernat Picornell in Barcelona, Spain.

Records
Prior to this competition, the existing world and Olympic records were as follows.

The following new world and Olympic records were set during this competition.

BK – Backstroke lead-off leg

Results

Heats
Rule: The eight fastest teams advance to the final (Q).

Final

References

External links
 Official Report

Swimming at the 1992 Summer Olympics
4 × 100 metre medley relay
Men's events at the 1992 Summer Olympics